This is a list of the Austria national football team results from 1902 to 1929.

1902

1903

1904

1905

1906

1907

1908

1909

1910

1911

1912

1913

1914

1915

1916

1917

1918

1919

1920

1921

1922

1923

1924

1925

1926

1927

1928

1929

External links
Results at RSSSF 

1900s in Austria
1910s in Austria
1920s in Austria
1900